IDPN (3,3'-iminodipropanenitrile) is a neurotoxin with ototoxic and hepatotoxic effects. It causes irreversible movement disorder.

Ototoxicity 
IDPN has been shown to kill vestibular hair cells, disrupting normal vestibular function, in rats, mice, guinea pigs, and frogs. In rodents, the loss of vestibular function results in balance-related deficits, including circling behavior, retropulsion, and head bobbing, as well as weight loss. Type I hair cells are more sensitive to IDPN toxicity than Type II hair cells. No regeneration of vestibular hair cells was observed, thus these effects can be considered to be irreversible.

IDPN has also been shown to kill cochlear hair cells, affecting auditory function. IDPN-induced hearing loss covered a broad range of frequencies.

References

Neurotoxins
Amines
Nitriles
Hepatotoxins